Heike Rohrmann (born 22 February 1969) was an East German shot putter.

Biography
She won the gold medal at the 1986 World Junior Championships and a silver medal at the 1988 World Junior Championships. Her personal best throw was 18.94 metres, achieved in May 1988 in Halle. This places her among the best junior athletes (age 19 and less) of all time. However, she lacked significant achievements on the senior level due to a unsuccessful knee surgery.

Achievements

References

External links 

1969 births
Living people
East German female shot putters
World Athletics U20 Championships winners